Juttadinteria is a genus of plants in the family Aizoaceae.

Species include:

 Juttadinteria deserticola (Marloth) Schwantes
 Juttadinteria kovisimontana (Dinter) Schwantes
 Juttadinteria simpsonii (Dinter) Schwantes
 Juttadinteria suavissima (Dinter) Schwantes

 
Aizoaceae genera
Taxonomy articles created by Polbot